Baby God is an 2020 American documentary film, directed and produced by Hannah Olson, which follows Quincy Fortier, a doctor who used his own sperm to inseminate fertility patients. Heidi Ewing and Rachel Grady were executive producers under their Loki Films banner.

It had its world premiere at the Nantucket Film Festival on June 23, 2020, and was released on December 2, 2020, by HBO.

Synopsis
Quincy Fortier, in a fertility fraud scheme begun in the 1960s, for more than 30 years secretly used his own sperm to inseminate his fertility patients, without their knowledge or consent. Decades later, his biological children discover Fortier is their father and search for answers.

Production
Olson discovered the story after hearing about a doctor using his own sperm to inseminate his fertility patients, and brought it to Heidi Ewing and Rachel Grady who agreed to produce the film, and brought it to HBO Documentary Films who agreed to produce and distribute. Olson felt the story was relevant in the context of Me Too movement and felt it was time to reframe the US fertility industry to a public health concern.

Release
The film was set to have its world premiere at South by Southwest in March 2020, however, the festival was cancelled due to the COVID-19 pandemic. The film had its world premiere at the Nantucket Film Festival on June 23, 2020. It also screened at DOC NYC on November 11, 2020. It was released on December 2, 2020.

Reception

Critical reception
The site's critical consensus reads, "Baby God is unavoidably nauseating as it unearths a heinous legacy, but Hannah Olson's sensitive study of the victims gives this documentary a worthwhile poignancy."

See also 
 Donald Cline
 Cecil Jacobson
 Bernard Norman Barwin
 List of people with the most children
 I Want It All Now!
 Our Father (2022 film)

References

External links
 
 

2020 films
2020 documentary films
American documentary films
HBO documentary films
2020s English-language films
2020s American films